The Tale of the Ticker is a 1913 American silent short drama film directed by Allan Dwan. The film stars J. Warren Kerrigan, Vivian Rich, George Periolat, and Charlotte Burton. Other cast members include James Harrison,  Jack Richardson, and Charles Morrison.

External links

1913 films
1913 drama films
Silent American drama films
American silent short films
American black-and-white films
1913 short films
Films directed by Allan Dwan
1910s American films
1910s English-language films
American drama short films